Horse Lake is a closed railway station on the Broken Hill railway line in New South Wales, Australia. The station opened in 1923 and closed in 1974.

The railway was also the filming location for the fictional “Tiboonda” township in the 1971 psychological thriller Wake In Fright, based on the Kenneth Cook novel by the same name.

References

Disused regional railway stations in New South Wales
Railway stations in Australia opened in 1923
Railway stations closed in 1974
1974 disestablishments in Australia